Feteira  may refer to:

Feteira (Angra do Heroísmo), a parish in the district of Angra do Heroísmo, Azores
Feteira (Horta), a parish in the municipality of Horta, Azores